Sacred Heart Canossian College, Macau is a girls' secondary school in Macau. Established in 1939, it is a sister school to the more famous Sacred Heart Canossian College in neighbouring Hong Kong. There are three main buildings in the campus, Marian's Building, Magdelene's Building and Bakhita's Building.

Notable alumni
 Ina Chan Un Chan

See also

 List of schools in Macau

External links

 https://shcces.edu.mo/

Catholic secondary schools in Macau
Canossian educational institutions
 Educational institutions established in 1939
1939 establishments in the Portuguese Empire